Broken Helix is a third-person shooter game developed and published by Konami for the PlayStation in 1997. It was marketed as featuring "4-D" gameplay, referencing the fact that the game's events all unfold in real time (time is sometimes referred to as the fourth dimension). This allows the player to activate and deactivate certain objects in later levels of the game. It also has four plot lines, allowing the player to finish the game in four different ways.

Gameplay

Plot
The game takes place in the year 2026 in a fictitious version of Area 51. The main character is explosives expert Jake Burton of the Marine division, voiced by Bruce Campbell. His father worked at this top-secret military base when Jake was nine years old. He had "died in a plane crash on his way to work 15 years ago, along with 10 other scientists." After Jake's father's death, the government denied any existence of Area 51. Jake got orders via telephone from a man who would not give his name, but said he knew Jake's father very well. Jake was deployed and the game begins.

Jake's mission is to defuse explosives set on levels one and two of the base. A scientist named Fitz demands "two million dollars in unmarked bills, a private jet, and a televised interview" and the timer starts counting down at 20 minutes. A platoon of six Marines, led by the sinister Marine commander Black Dawn, whose orders are to "clean things up after you complete your mission."

The first bomb, located in the men's bathroom on Level 1 for reasons untold, is defused. The automated guns on Level 2 are deactivated in the Satlink. Jake heads down to Level 2 and defuses the second bomb. Jake is then given orders to hold his position and Black Dawn is given orders to kill him. A mysterious man who wants to help Jake tells him of Black Dawn's orders. A strange field surrounds the base, preventing radio contact from outside the base. From here, the player has four choices on how to complete the game.

Plot 1 
Jake meets a reporter who gives him a satellite link (satlink) amplifier. He is also given a key for an express elevator up to the Satlink. The amplifier is installed and the strange man tells him of Project Broken Helix and gives him the password to access the file. Jake acquires the file about Broken Helix from the Level 3 Lab and gives it to Fitz in the Command Centre on Level 4. Black Dawn and his team enter the command centre and Fitz is killed. Jake meets up with a scientist named Reese on Level 6 and finds out why his father was murdered. Reese leads him down to Level 7, where he shows Jake what Broken Helix actually is. "Their DNA is unraveling at an alarming rate, causing strange mutations to occur. Freezing them was the only way to stop them until we find a cure."

Jack finds out that Project Broken Helix was an experiment for biological warfare. It turned humans into hybrid aliens, but an unintentional side-effect made them see humans as enemies, and therefore, kill them. For this reason, the military wanted to shut it down because it had gone too far. Reese did not want the aliens to die, so he locked up the elevators to Level 6 so he could find a cure that would reverse the effects of Broken Helix. Jake's father had found this cure, and was killed for this reason.

Jake is told to get a force field device from Level 10, bring it back to Reese, and set up an explosive on a fusion reactor droid on Level 9. However, someone lets Black Dawn into Level 6 and Jake has to activate a teleporter. Jake kills three of the remaining Marines, as two were killed on their way down to Level 6. Jake sets the explosives and he and Reese get down to Level 10 to activate the droid. They head across the level to activate a force field device to contain the explosion. On their way, they meet up with Black Dawn and a traitor named Jenkins. Jake blows up Black Dawn with the other detonator and they activate the force field device in an alien ship. Jenkins meets up with the two in the ship and Jake finds out that he was the one who killed his father. Reese is knocked out by Jenkins and the alien queen eats Jenkins alive. The alien queen is then killed by Jake. Jake and Reese head out of range of the force field so they do not get blown up with the aliens.

Jake and Reese exit the base only to be confronted by a sergeant. The strange man gives him new orders to let them go and Jake is evacuated. Jake and his wife retire. As for Reese, he disappeared two days after the Area 51 incident and Jake never saw him again.

Plot 2 
Jake acquires a key from a stunned scientist. He uses this to open one of the gas chambers, talks to one of the hybrids and is given another key that looks something like a blue flame. Jake uses this on the gas chambers and a hybrid gives him a blue jewel. When on Level 8, he goes into a side passage and uses this gem to get into a room. The alien queen telepathically talks to Jake and tells him she needs his help. He uses the gem on a pillar and turns into a spider-like hybrid. A door blows open and a bunch of Marines are freed. Jake is told by the alien queen to get an alien warrior to follow him to the queen's ship (she wants to go to her home world, and the warrior has the co-ordinates). On the way, he runs into Black Dawn and Psyches. He kills them, moves on and enters the ship with the alien warrior.

The alien queen insists Jake comes with her so he does not get killed. Jake helps pilot the giant ship and readies himself for his new life.

Plot 3 

On Level 2, Jake meets a reporter that was supposed to interview Fitz, but her cameraman died on his way down to the command center (Fitz' hideout).

Plot 4

Development
Early in development, Broken Helix was a first-person shooter.

Reception

Broken Helix received mixed reviews, with critics generally praising the story progression but criticizing the gameplay and graphics. The most common complaint was that the grainy polygons, poor lighting, and rigid over-the-shoulder perspective often make it difficult for players to see what they're doing. Some critics also cited control issues, and a review published in both IGN and Next Generation (with minor changes between the publications) reported that the detection on the cameras is faulty, occasionally resulting in an immediate game over without the player having made any mistakes.

Reviews generally praised the game's humor, particularly Bruce Campbell's deadpan delivery, though Next Generation and Shawn Smith of Electronic Gaming Monthly both said that all the non-Campbell voices are overacted and annoying.

Most critics were impressed by the intriguing storyline and its multiple paths, often arguing they make the game worth consideration in spite of the gameplay issues. For instance, Josh Smith summarized Broken Helix in GameSpot as "a complex web of plotlines in a 3D shooter/adventure whose shortcomings in control and graphical clarity are made up for by the game's narrative twists and tough real-time challenges." Likewise, GamePro concluded that "Broken Helixs so-so action gameplay is in need or repair. Science fiction sleuths, however, may find Helix's plot twists and turns a compelling turn-on."

References

External links

1997 video games
Konami games
PlayStation (console)-only games
Science fiction video games
Single-player video games
Third-person shooters
Video games about bomb disposal
Video games developed in the United States
Video games set in Nevada
Video games about the United States Marine Corps
PlayStation (console) games